Leonid Stepanovych Stadnyk (5 August 1970 – 24 August 2014) was a Ukrainian man who claimed to have stood at  though the photographic evidence suggests he was no more than 7 ft 7 in (2.31m).

Death
Stadnyk died at the age of 44 on 24 August 2014 from a brain hemorrhage.

See also
 List of tallest people
 Bao Xishun, the previous holder of tallest man Guinness title
 Robert Wadlow (1918–1940), the tallest man in history
 Sultan Kösen, the current tallest man in Guinness title

References

External links
 https://www.gq.com/story/lenoid-stadnyk-tallest-man-russia-200503?printable=true
 PHOTO from life of giant 
 AP article
 San Clemente doctor gets to know giant, The Orange County Register
 Photo at Ukrainian country side, Photos in UemA
 
 Guinness official record of Leonid Stadnyk's height, based on a measurement by the Ukrainian Book of Records.

1969 births
2014 deaths
People with gigantism
People from Zhytomyr Oblast
Zhytomyr National Agroecological University alumni
Ukrainian veterinarians